Bob Bryan and Mike Bryan were the defending champions but lost in the first round to James Blake and Martin Verkerk.

Mark Knowles and Daniel Nestor won in the final 6–4, 6–2 against Lucas Arnold and Mariano Hood.

Seeds
Champion seeds are indicated in bold text while text in italics indicates the round in which those seeds were eliminated.

  Bob Bryan /  Mike Bryan (first round)
  Mark Knowles /  Daniel Nestor (champions)
  Martin Damm /  Cyril Suk (first round)
  Lucas Arnold /  Mariano Hood (final)

Draw

External links
 2003 Davidoff Swiss Indoors Doubles Draw

2003 ATP Tour
2003 Davidoff Swiss Indoors